Hilker is a surname. Notable people with the surname include:

Edward F. Hilker (1881–1949), American politician
Georg Hilker (1807–1875), Danish painter
Monika Hilker (born 1959), German zoologist
Nadia Hilker (born 1988), German actress
Wilfried Hilker (born 1930), German football referee